Less than two years after it had opened, InterContinental surrendered the management of its second London property – InterContinental London Westminster, located in the former Queen Anne's Chambers. It became the Conrad London St. James in September, 2014.  It has 256 guest rooms and suites, 7 meeting rooms and a restaurant. This stately structure, with its 19th-century façade, was once a war-time residence of lobbyists and civil servants. The building was renovated and opened its doors as London's first Conrad hotel. Nowadays the stylish interior features original art installations and a contemporary design. The press release stated that the hotel would become the twenty-fourth Conrad hotel, and the first in London.

Queen Anne's Chambers
Built at the turn of the 20th century, Queen Anne's Chambers was a collection of chambers available for short to mid-term rent for those with a need to be close to the seat of power, being located very close to the Houses of Parliament. It was the war-time location in Westminster for those lobbyists and civil servants whose industries faced dramatic impact from the onset of war. One of the earliest tenants of note was The Brewers' Society, who between 1909 and 1917 took premises in Queen Anne's Chambers to engage government with its growing concern over the output of beer and imposed limits on the use of sugar in brewing at a time of rationing. In later years, the Treasury Solicitor was also based at Queen Anne's Chambers.

Division Bell

The hotel is situated within hearing distance of the Division Bell – the bell that tolls when there is a division in parliament, signalling that all members must return to vote.

References

Hilton Hotels & Resorts hotels
Hotels in the City of Westminster
Hotels established in 2012
2012 establishments in England